This is a list of people who have served as mayor or president of the city council of the city of Rijeka, third largest city in Croatia.

See also
 Rijeka

External links
 Grad Rijeka - Gradonačelnici od 1948-2013.
 Riječki kapetani, guverneri, šefovi države i gradonačelnici - Croinfo.net

Rijeka